Lindell is a Swedish surname.

Geographical distribution
As of 2014, 44.8% of all known bearers of the surname Lindell were residents of Sweden (frequency 1:1,779), 38.3% of the United States (1:76,262), 10.1% of Finland (1:4,383), 1.4% of Canada (1:206,730), 1.1% of Denmark (1:41,811) and 1.1% of Australia (1:180,105).

In Sweden, the frequency of the surname was higher than national average (1:1,779) in the following counties:
 1. Skåne County (1:998)
 2. Blekinge County (1:1,006)
 3. Södermanland County (1:1,099)
 4. Jönköping County (1:1,117)
 5. Östergötland County (1:1,140)
 6. Gotland County (1:1,218)
 7. Uppsala County (1:1,476)
 8. Örebro County (1:1,567)
 9. Västmanland County (1:1,572)
 10. Kalmar County (1:1,608)
 11. Kronoberg County (1:1,664)

In Finland, the frequency of the surname was higher than national average (1:4,383) in the following regions:
 1. Ostrobothnia (1:1,337)
 2. Central Ostrobothnia (1:1,423)
 3. Pirkanmaa (1:2,087)
 4. Southwest Finland (1:2,810)
 5. Åland (1:3,229)
 6. Satakunta (1:3,812)
 7. Uusimaa (1:3,893)

People
 Eric Lindell, American singer-songwriter
 Esa Lindell, Finnish ice hockey player
 Jenny Lindell, Australian politician and Speaker of the Victorian Legislative Assembly
 Johnny Lindell (1916-1985), American baseball player
 Ingvar Lindell (1904–1993), Swedish jurist and politician
 Mary Lindell (1895-1986), member of the Voluntary Aid Detachment during World War I
 Michael J. Lindell (born 1961), American businessman and inventor
 Rian Lindell (born 1977), American football player
 Roy Lindell, fictional FBI agent created by Michael Connelly
 Unni Lindell, Norwegian writer
 Yehuda Lindell, Israeli cryptographer
 Nancy Karetak-Lindell, Canadian politician
 Jessica Lindell-Vikarby, Swedish Alpine Ski racer

References

Swedish-language surnames